is a professional Japanese baseball player. He is an outfielder for the Saitama Seibu Lions of Nippon Professional Baseball (NPB).

References 

1998 births
Living people
Nippon Professional Baseball outfielders
Baseball people from Shizuoka Prefecture
Saitama Seibu Lions players